The Citadel of Chaos is a single-player adventure gamebook written by Steve Jackson and illustrated by Russ Nicholson. Originally published by Puffin Books in 1983, the title is the second gamebook in the Fighting Fantasy series. It was later republished by Wizard Books in 2002. The gamebook was also adapted into a video game.

Rules

Story
The Citadel of Chaos is a fantasy scenario in which the player takes the role of an adventurer magician hero must navigate the hazardous castle of the evil wizard Balthus Dire. To confront Dire, the player must avoid monsters and collecting several artefacts that will allow passage past guardians to the villain's inner sanctum.

Reception
Marcus L. Rowland reviewed The Citadel of Chaos for the June 1983 issue of White Dwarf, rating the title a 9 out of a possible 10. Rowland called The Citadel of Chaos "an exciting adventure", and noted that the book's introduction of magic as an extra characteristic "adds a new range of decisions to encounters".

Karen L. Miller, staff writer at Reading Eagle, stated that the title featured "an elaborate combat system with adventure score sheets. This way you read and at the same time...conquer the dreaded sorcerer at the heart of The Citadel of Chaos".

In other media
A video game based on the book was released by Puffin Books for the ZX Spectrum and Commodore 64 in 1984.

In 2010, an electronic version of the title was released for the iPhone and iPad by Big Blue Bubble. When Big Blue Bubble later lost the license, all its apps were withdrawn.

In 2018, the audio company FoxYason Music Productions, known for their work with Big Finish Productions announced that they would be releasing an original, full-cast audio drama based on The Citadel of Chaos in a CD boxset with The Forest of Doom, Deathtrap Dungeon, and Creature of Havoc for summer 2018. It will be written by David N. Smith, directed by Richard Fox and will feature Rachel Atkins returning to the role of Vale Moonwing from FoxYason Music's first release based on The Warlock of Firetop Mountain, sub-titled The Hero's Quest.

References

External links
 Fighting Fantasy Gamebooks - the official website
 Wizard Books - the Publisher's site

1983 fiction books
Books by Steve Jackson (British game designer)
Fighting Fantasy gamebooks